Grover Bill Bowers (March 25, 1922 – September 17, 1996) was an outfielder in Major League Baseball. He played for the Chicago White Sox in 1949.

References

External links

1922 births
1996 deaths
Chicago White Sox players
Major League Baseball outfielders
Baseball players from Arkansas
People from Parkin, Arkansas
Memphis Chickasaws players
Gadsden Pilots players
Toronto Maple Leafs (International League) players
People from Wynne, Arkansas